This is a list of law enforcement agencies in the state of Illinois.

According to the US Bureau of Justice Statistics' 2008 Census of State and Local Law Enforcement Agencies, the state had 877 law enforcement agencies employing 41,277 sworn police officers, about 321 for each 100,000 residents.

State agencies 
 Illinois Attorney General's Office
 Department of Investigations
 Illinois Attorney General Police
 Illinois Commerce Commission Police
 Illinois Department of Corrections
 Illinois Department of Human Services Police Department
 Illinois Department of Natural Resources
 Illinois Conservation Police
 Illinois Department of Revenue Police
 Bureau of Criminal Investigations
 Illinois Gaming Board
 Illinois Law Enforcement Training and Standards Board  
 Illinois Secretary of State
Illinois Secretary of State Capitol Police
 Illinois Secretary of State Police
 Illinois State Fire Marshal Arson Investigation
 Illinois State Police

County agencies

Sheriff's departments/offices 

 Adams County Sheriff's Office
 Alexander County Sheriff's Office
 Bond County Sheriff's Office
 Boone County Sheriff's Office
 Brown County Sheriff's Office
 Bureau County Sheriff's Office
 Calhoun County Sheriff's Office
 Carroll County Sheriff's Office
 Cass County Sheriff's Office
 Champaign County Sheriff's Office
 Christian County Sheriff's Office
 Clark County Sheriff's Office
 Clay County Sheriff's Office
 Clinton County Sheriff's Office
 Coles County Sheriff's Office
 Cook County Sheriff's Office
 Crawford County Sheriff's Office
 Cumberland County Sheriff's Office
 DeKalb County Sheriff's Office
 Dewitt County Sheriff's Office
 Douglas County Sheriff's Office
 DuPage County Sheriff's Office
 Edgar County Sheriff's Office
 Edwards County Sheriff's Office
 Effingham County Sheriff's Office
 Fayette County Sheriff's Office
 Ford County Sheriff's Office
 Franklin County Sheriff's Office
 Fulton County Sheriff's Office
 Gallatin County Sheriff's Office
 Greene County Sheriff's Office
 Grundy County Sheriff's Office
 Hamilton County Sheriff's Office
 Hancock County Sheriff's Office
 Hardin County Sheriff's Office
 Henderson County Sheriff's Office
 Henry County Sheriff's Office
 Iroquois County Sheriff's Office
 Jackson County Sheriff's Office
 Jasper County Sheriff's Office
 Jefferson County Sheriff's Office
 Jersey County Sheriff's Office
 Jo Daviess County Sheriff's Office
 Johnson County Sheriff's Office
 Kane County Sheriff's Office
 Kankakee County Sheriff's Office
 Kendall County Sheriff's Office
 Knox County Sheriff's Office
 LaSalle County Sheriff's Office
 Lake County Sheriff's Office
 Lawrence County Sheriff's Office
 Lee County Sheriff's Office
 Livingston County Sheriff's Office
 Logan County Sheriff's Office
 Macon County Sheriff's Office
 Macoupin County Sheriff's Office
 Madison County Sheriff's Office
 Marion County Sheriff's Office
 Marshall County Sheriff's Office
 Mason County Sheriff's Office
 Massac County Sheriff's Office
 Mc Donough County Sheriff's Office
 Mc Henry County Sheriff's Department
 Mc Lean County Sheriff's Office
 Menard County Sheriff's Office
 Mercer County Sheriff's Office
 Monroe County Sheriff's Office
 Montgomery County Sheriff's Office
 Morgan County Sheriff's Office
 Moultrie County Sheriff's Office
 Ogle County Sheriff's Office
 Peoria County Sheriff's Office
 Perry County Sheriff's Office
 Piatt County Sheriff's Office
 Pike County Sheriff's Office
 Pope County Sheriff's Office
 Pulaski County Sheriff's Office
 Putnam County Sheriff's Office
 Randolph County Sheriff's Office
 Richland County Sheriff's Office
 Rock Island County Sheriff's Office
 Saint Clair County Sheriff's Office
 Saline County Sheriff's Office
 Sangamon County Sheriff's Office
 Schuyler County Sheriff's Office
 Scott County Sheriff's Office
 Shelby County Sheriff's Office
 Stark County Sheriff's Office
 Stephenson County Sheriff's Office
 Tazewell County Sheriff's Office
 Union County Sheriff's Office
 Vermilion County Sheriff's Office
 Wabash County Sheriff's Office
 Warren County Sheriff's Office
 Washington County Sheriff's Office
 Wayne County Sheriff's Office
 White County Sheriff's Office
 Whiteside County Sheriff's Office
 Will County Sheriff's Office
 Williamson County Sheriff's Office
 Winnebago County Sheriff's Office
 Woodford County Sheriff's Office

County Forest Preserve police departments 
 Forest Preserve District of Cook County, Department of Law Enforcement
 Forest Preserve District of DuPage County, Law Enforcement Department
 Forest Preserve District of Kane County, Public Safety Department
 Lake County Forest Preserve District, Public Safety Department, aka Ranger Police Department
 McHenry County Conservation District Police, Law enforcement for forest preserves in McHenry County
 Forest Preserve District of Will County, Police Department

Other county departments 
 Cook County State's Attorneys Office, Investigations Unit
 Cook County Health and Hospitals System Police Department
 Stroger Hospital Police Department
 McHenry County Conservation Police Department
 Vermilion County Conservation Police Department

Municipal agencies 

 Abingdon Police Department
 Addison Police Department
 Albany Police Department
 Albers Police Department
 Albion Police Department
 Aledo Police Department
 Alexis Police Department
 Algonquin Police Department
 Alma Police Department
 Alorton Police Department
 Alpha Police Department
 Alsip Police Department
 Altamont Police Department
 Alton Police Department
 Altona Police Department
 Alvin Police Department
 Amboy Police Department
 Andalusia Police Department
 Anna Police Department
 Annawan Police Department
 Antioch Police Department
 Apple River Police Department
 Arcola Police Department
 Argenta Police Department
 Arlington Heights Police Department
 Armington Police Department
 Aroma Park Police Department 
 Arthur Police Department 
 Ashkum Police Department 
 Ashland Police Department
 Ashley Police Department
 Ashton Police Department
 Assumption Police Department
 Astoria Police Department
 Athens Police Department
 Atkinson Police Department
 Atlanta Police Department
 Atwood Police Department
 Auburn Police Department
 Augusta Police Department
 Aurora Police Department
 Ava Police Department
 Aviston Police Department
 Avon Police Department
 Baldwin Police Department
 Bannockburn Police Department
 Barrington Police Department
 Barrington Hills Police Department
 Barrington-Inverness Police Department
 Barry Police Department
 Bartlett Police Department
 Bartonville Police Department
 Batavia Police Department
 Bath Police Department
 Baylis Police Department
 Bayview Gardens Police Department
 Beardstown Police Department
 Beckemeyer Police Department
 Bedford Park Police Department
 Beecher Police Department
 Belgium Police Department
 Belleville Police Department
 Bellflower Police Department
 Bellwood Police Department
 Belvidere Police Department
 Bement Police Department
 Benld Police Department
 Bensenville Police Department
 Benton Police Department
 Berkeley Police Department
 Berwyn Police Department
 Bethalto Police Department
 Bethany Police Department
 Blandinsville Police Department
 Bloomingdale Police Department
 Bloomington Police Department
 Blue Island Police Department
 Blue Mound Police Department
 Bluffs Police Department
 Bolingbrook Police Department
 Bonnie Police Department
 Bourbonnais Police Department
 Bradford Police Department
 Bradley Police Department
 Braidwood Police Department
 Breese Police Department
 Bridgeport Police Department
 Bridgeview Police Department
 Brighton Police Department
 Broadview Police Department
 Brocton Police Department
 Brookfield Police Department
 Brooklyn Police Department
 Brookport Police Department
 Brownstown Police Department
 Buckner Police Department
 Buda Police Department
 Buffalo Grove Police Department
 Buffalo-Mechanicsburg Police Department
 Bull Valley Police Department
 Buncombe Police Department
 Bunker Hill Police Department
 Burbank Police Department
 Bureau Police Department
 Burnham Police Department
 Burr Ridge Police Department
 Bushnell Police Department
 Byron Police Department
 Cahokia Police Department
 Cairo Police Department
 Calumet City Police Department
 Calumet Park Police Department
 Cambria Police Department
 Camp Point Police Department
 Campton Hills Police Department
 Canton Police Department
 Carbondale Police Department
 Carlinville Police Department
 Carlyle Police Department
 Carmi Police Department
 Carol Stream Police Department
 Carpentersville Police Department
 Carrier Mills Police Department
 Carrollton Police Department
 Carterville Police Department
 Carthage Police Department
 Cary Police Department
 Casey Police Department
 Caseyville Police Department
 Catlin Police Department
 Cave-In-Park Police Department
 Cedar Point Police Department
 Cedarville Police Department
 Central City Police Department
 Centralia Police Department
 Centreville Police Department
 Cerro Gordo Police Department
 Chadwick Police Department
 Champaign Police Department 
 Chandlerville Police Department
 Channahon Police Department
 Chapin Police Department
 Charleston Police Department
 Chatham Police Department
 Chebanse Police Department
 Chenoa Police Department
 Cherry Police Department 
 Cherry Valley Police Department
 Chester Police Department
 Chesterfield Police Department
 Chicago Heights Police Department
 Chicago Police Department
 Chicago Ridge Police Department
 Chillicothe Police Department
 Chrisman Police Department
 Christopher Police Department
 Cicero Police Department
 Cissna Park Police Department
 Clarendon Hills Police Department
 Clayton Police Department
 Clinton Police Department
 Coal City Police Department
 Coal Valley Police Department
 Cobden Police Department
 Coffeen Police Department
 Colchester Police Department
 Colfax Police Department
 Collinsville Police Department
 Colona Police Department
 Columbia Police Department
 Cordova Police Department
 Cortland Police Department
 Coulterville Police Department
 Country Club Hills Police Department
 Countryside Police Department
 Cowden Police Department
 Crainsville Police Department
 Creal Springs Police Department
 Crest Hill Police Department
 Crestwood Police Department
 Crete Police Department
 Creve Coeur Police Department
 Crossville Police Department
 Crystal Lake Police Department
 Cuba Police Department
 Cutler Police Department
 Cypress Police Department
 Dallas City Police Department
 Dalzell Police Department
 Dana Police Department
 Danvers Police Department
 Danville Police Department
 Darien Police Department
 De Pue Police Department 
 Decatur Police Department
 Deer Creek-Goodfield Police Department
 Deerfield Police Department
 Dekalb Police Department
 Delavan Police Department
 DePue Police Department
 Des Plaines Police Department
 DeSoto Police Department
 Divernon Police Department
 Dixmoor Police Department
 Dixon Police Department
 Dolton Police Department
 Dongola Police Department
 Donnellson Police Department
 Dowell Police Department
 Downers Grove Police Department
 Downs Police Department
 Du Quoin Police Department
 Dunfermline Police Department
 Dupo Police Department
 Durand Police Department
 Dwight Police Department
 Earlville Police Department
 East Alton Police Department
 East Carondelet Police Department
 East Dubuque Police Department
 East Dundee Police Department
 East Galesburg Police Department
 East Hazel Crest Police Department
 East Moline Police Department
 East Peoria Police Department
 East St Louis Police Department
 Easton Police Department
 Edinburg Police Department
 Edwardsville Police Department
 Effingham Police Department
 El Paso Police Department
 Elburn Police Department
 Eldorado Police Department
 Elgin Police Department
 Elizabeth Police Department
 Elk Grove Village Police Department
 Elkhart Police Department
 Elkville Police Department
 Ellis Grove Police Department
 Elmhurst Police Department
 Elmwood Police Department
 Elmwood Park Police Department
 Elsah Police Department
 Elwood Police Department
 Emden Police Department
 Energy Police Department
 Enfield Police Department
 Erie Police Department
 Eureka Police Department
 Evanston Police Department
 Evansville Police Department
 Evergreen Park Police Department
 Ewing Police Department
 Fairbury Police Department
 Fairfield Police Department
 Fairmont City Police Department
 Fairmount Police Department
 Fairview Heights Police Department
 Fairview Police Department
 Farina Police Department
 Farmer City Police Department
 Farmington Police Department
 Fayetteville Police Department
 Fillmore Police Department
 Findlay Police Department
 Fisher Police Department
 Fithian Police Department
 Flora Police Department
 Flossmoor Police Department
 Forest City Police Department
 Forest Park Police Department
 Forest View Police Department
 Fox Lake Police Department
 Fox River Grove Police Department
 Frankfort Police Department
 Franklin Grove Police Department
 Franklin Park Police Department
 Freeburg Police Department
 Freeport Police Department
 Fulton Police Department
 Galatia Police Department
 Galena Police Department
 Galesburg Police Department
 Galva Police Department
 Gardner Police Department
 Geneseo Police Department
 Geneva Police Department
 Genoa Police Department
 Georgetown Police Department
 German Valley Police Department
 Gibson City Police Department
 Gillespie Police Department
 Gilman Police Department
 Girard Police Department
 Gladstone Police Department
 Glasford Police Department
 Glen Carbon Police Department
 Glen Ellyn Police Department
 Glencoe Department of Public Safety
 Glendale Heights Police Department
 Glenview Police Department
 Glenwood Police Department
 Golconda Police Department
 Golf Police Department
 Goreville Police Department
 Grafton Police Department
 Grandview Police Department
 Granite City Police Department
 Granville Police Department
 Grant Park Police Department
 Grayslake Police Department
 Grayville Police Department
 Great Lakes Police Department
 Green Valley Police Department
 Greenfield Police Department
 Greenup Police Department
 Greenview Police Department
 Greenville Police Department
 Gridley Police Department
 Griggsville Police Department
 Gulfport Police Department
 Gurnee Police Department
 Hamel Police Department
 Hamilton Police Department
 Hampshire Police Department
 Hampton Police Department
 Hanover Park Police Department
 Hanover Police Department
 Hardin Police Department
 Harrisburg Police Department
 Hartford Police Department
 Harvard Police Department
 Harvel Police Department
 Harvey Police Department
 Harwood Heights Police Department
 Havana Police Department
 Hawthorn Woods Police Department
 Hazel Crest Police Department
 Hebron Police Department
 Hennepin Police Department
 Henry Police Department
 Herrin Police Department
 Herscher Police Department
 Heyworth Police Department
 Hickory Hills Police Department
 Highland Park Police Department
 Highland Police Department
 Highwood Police Department
 Hillcrest Police Department
 Hillsboro Police Department
 Hillside Police Department
 Hinckley Police Department
 Hinsdale Police Department
 Hodgkins Police Department
 Hoffman Estates Police Department
 Hometown Police Department
 Homewood Police Department
 Hoopeston Police Department
 Hopedale Police Department
 Hudson Police Department
 Huntley Police Department
 Hurst Police Department
 Illiopolis Police Department
 India Head Park Police Department
 Inverness Police Department
 Irvington Police Department 
 Island Lake Police Department
 Itasca Police Department
 Jacksonville Police Department
 Jerome Police Department
 Jerseyville Police Department
 Johnsburg Police Department
 Johnston City Police Department
 Joliet Police Department
 Jonesboro Police Department
 Justice Police Department
 Kankakee Police Department
 Kansas Police Department
 Karnak Police Department
 Keithsburg Police Department
 Kenilworth Police Department
 Kewanee Police Department
 Kildeer Police Department
 Kincaid Police Department
 Kingston Police Department
 Kinmundy Police Department
 Kirkland Police Department 
 Knoxville Police Department
 La Grange Park Police Department
 La Grange Police Department
 La Harpe Police Department
 La Salle Police Department
 Lacon Police Department
 Ladd Police Department
 Lake Bluff Police Department
 Lake Forest Police Department
 Lake in the Hills Police Department
 Lake Zurich Police Department
 Lakemoor Police Department
 LaMoille Police Department 
 Lanark Police Department
 Lansing Police Department
 Lawrenceville Police Department
 Lebanon Police Department
 Leland Police Department
 Lemont Police Department
 Lena Police Department
 Lenzburg Police Department
 LeRoy Police Department
 Lewistown Police Department
 Lexington Police Department
 Libertyville Police Department
 Lincoln Police Department
 Lincolnshire Police Department
 Lincolnwood Police Department
 Lindenhurst Police Department
 Lisle Police Department
 Litchfield Police Department
 Livingston Police Department
 Lockport Police Department
 Lomax Police Department
 Lombard Police Department
 Loves Park Police Department
 Lovington Police Department
 Ludlow Police Department
 Lyndon Police Department
 Lyons Police Department
 Mackinaw Police Department
 Macomb Police Department
 Madison Police Department
 Mahomet Police Department
 Malta Police Department
 Manhattan Police Department
 Manito Police Department
 Mansfield Police Department
 Manteno Police Department
 Marengo Police Department
 Marion Police Department
 Marissa Police Department
 Markham Police Department
 Maroa Police Department
 Marseilles Police Department
 Marshall Police Department
 Martinsville Police Department
 Maryville Police Department
 Mascoutah Police Department
 Mason City Police Department
 Matteson Police Department
 Mattoon Police Department
 Maywood Police Department
 McCook Police Department
 McCullom Lake Police Department
 McHenry Police Department
 McLeansboro Police Department
 Melrose Park Police Department
 Mendota Police Department
 Meredosia Police Department
 Merrionette Park Police Department
 Metamora Police Department
 Metropolis Police Department
 Midlothian Police Department 
 Milan Police Department 
 Milford Police Department 
 Milledgeville Police Department
 Millstadt Police Department
 Minier-Armington Police Department
 Minonk Police Department
 Minooka Police Department
 Mokena Police Department
 Moline Police Department
 Momence Police Department
 Monee Police Department
 Montgomery Police Department
 Monticello Police Department
 Morris Police Department
 Morrison Police Department
 Morrisonville Police Department
 Morton Grove Police Department
 Morton Police Department
 Mound City Police Department
 Mounds Police Department
 Mount Carmel Police Department
 Mount Carroll Police Department
 Mount Morris Police Department
 Mount Olive Police Department
 Mount Prospect Police Department
 Mount Pulaski Police Department
 Mount Sterling Police Department
 Mount Vernon Police Department
 Mount Zion Police Department
 Moweaqua Police Department
 Mundelein Police Department
 Murphysboro Police Department
 Naperville Police Department
 Nashville Police Department
 Nauvoo Police Department
 Neoga Police Department
 Neponset Police Department 
 New Athens Police Department
 New Baden Police Department
 New Berlin Police Department
 New Lenox Police Department
 Newman Police Department
 Newton Police Department
 Niles Police Department
 Nokomis Police Department
 Normal Police Department
 Norridge Police Department
 Norris City Police Department
 North Aurora Police Department
 North Chicago Police Department
 North Pekin Police Department
 North Riverside Police Department
 Northbrook Police Department
 Northfield Police Department
 Northlake Police Department
 Oak Brook Police Department
 Oak Forest Police Department
 Oak Lawn Police Department
 Oak Park Police Department
 Oakbrook Terrace Police Department
 Oakland Police Department
 Oakwood Hills Police Department
 Oakwood Police Department
 Oblong Police Department
 Odin Police Department
 O'Fallon Police Department
 Oglesby Police Department
 Okawville Police Department
 Olney Police Department
 Olympia Fields Police Department
 Onarga Police Department
 Oquawka Police Department
 Oregon Police Department
 Orland Hills Police Department
 Orland Park Police Department
 Oswego Police Department
 Ottawa Police Department
 Palatine Police Department
 Palestine Police Department
 Palos Heights Police Department
 Palos Hills Police Department
 Palos Park Police Department
 Pana Police Department
 Paris Police Department
 Park City Police Department
 Park Forest Police Department
 Park Ridge Police Department
 Patoka Police Department
 Pawnee Police Department
 Paxton Police Department
 Payson Police Department
 Pearl City Police Department
 Pecatonica Police Department
 Pekin Police Department
 Peoria Heights Police Department
 Peoria Police Department
 Peotone Police Department
 Peru Police Department
 Petersburg Police Department
 Phoenix Police Department
 Pinckneyville Police Department
 Pingree Grove Police Department
 Piper City Police Department
 Pittsfield Police Department
 Plainfield Police Department
 Plano Police Department
 Pleasant Hill Police Department
 Pleasant Plains Police Department
 Polo Police Department
 Pontiac Police Department
 Pontoon Beach Police Department
 Port Byron Police Department
 Posen Police Department
 Prairie Grove Police Department
 Princeton Police Department
 Prophetstown Police Department
 Prospect Heights Police Department
 Quincy Police Department
 Rantoul Police Department
 Raymond Police Department
 Red Bud Police Department
 Richmond Police Department
 Richton Park Police Department
 Ridge Farm Police Department
 Ridgway Police Department
 River Forest Police Department
 River Grove Police Department
 Riverdale Police Department
 Riverside Police Department
 Riverton Police Department
 Riverwoods Police Department
 Robbins Police Department
 Robinson Police Department
 Rochelle Police Department
 Rochester Police Department
 Rock Falls Police Department
 Rock Island Police Department
 Rockford Police Department
 Rockton Police Department
 Rolling Meadows Police Department
 Romeoville Police Department
 Roodhouse Police Department
 Roscoe Police Department
 Roselle Police Department
 Rosemont Police Department
 Rosiclare Police Department
 Rossville Police Department
 Round Lake Beach Police Department
 Round Lake Heights Police Department
 Round Lake Park-Hainesville Police Department
 Round Lake Police Department
 Roxana Police Department
 Royal Lakes Police Department
 Royalton Police Department
 Rushville Police Department
 Salem Police Department
 San Jose Police Department
 Sandoval Police Department
 Sandwich Police Department
 Sauget Police Department
 Sauk Village Police Department
 Savanna Police Department
 Schaumburg Police Department
 Schiller Park Police Department
 Seneca Police Department
 Sesser Police Department
 Shannon Police Department
 Shawneetown Police Department
 Sheffield Police Department
 Shelbyville Police Department
 Sherman Police Department
 Sherrard Police Department
 Shiloh Police Department
 Shipman Police Department
 Shorewood Police Department
 Silvis Police Department
 Skokie Police Department
 Sleepy Hollow Police Department
 Smithton Police Department
 Somonauk Police Department
 South Beloit Police Department
 South Elgin Police Department
 South Holland Police Department
 South Jacksonville Police Department
 South Roxana Police Department
 Sparta Police Department
 Spring Valley Police Department
 Springfield Police Department
 St. Charles Police Department
 St. Elmo Police Department
 St. Peter Police Department
 Staunton Police Department
 Steeleville Police Department
 Steger Police Department
 Sterling Police Department
 Stickney Police Department
 Stockton Police Department
 Stone Park Police Department
 Streamwood Police Department
 Streator Police Department
 Sugar Grove Police Department
 Sullivan Police Department
 Summerfield Police Department
 Summit Police Department
 Sumner Police Department
 Swansea Police Department
 Sycamore Police Department
 Tampico Police Department
 Taylorville Police Department
 Teutopolis Police Department
 Thomasboro Police Department
 Thomson Police Department
 Thornton Police Department
 Tilton Police Department
 Tinley Park Police Department
 Tiskilwa Police Department 
 Toledo Police Department
 Tolono Police Department
 Toluca Police Department
 Toulon Police Department
 Tower Lakes Police Department
 Tremont Police Department
 Trenton Police Department
 Troy Police Department
 Tuscola Police Department
 Ullin Police Department
 University Park Police Department
 Urbana Police Department
 Utica Police Department
 Valmeyer Police Department
 Vandalia Police Department
 Venice Police Department
 Vernon Hills Police Department
 Vienna Police Department
 Villa Grove Police Department
 Villa Park Police Department
 Viola Police Department
 Virden Police Department
 Virginia Police Department
 Walnut Police Department
 Wamac Police Department 
 Warren Police Department
 Warrensburg Police Department
 Warrenville Police Department
 Washburn Police Department
 Washington Park Police Department
 Washington Police Department
 Waterloo Police Department
 Waterman Police Department
 Watseka Police Department
 Wauconda Police Department
 Waukegan Police Department
 Waverly Police Department
 Wayne Police Department
 Wenona Police Department
 West Chicago Police Department
 West Dundee Police Department
 West Frankfort Police Department
 West Salem Police Department
 Westchester Police Department
 Western Springs Police Department 
 Westmont Police Department
 Westville Police Department
 Wheaton Police Department
 Wheeling Police Department
 White Hall Police Department
 Williamson Police Department
 Willow Springs Police Department
 Willowbrook Police Department
 Wilmette Police Department
 Wilmington Police Department
 Wilsonville Police Department
 Windsor Police Department
 Winfield Police Department
 Winnebago Police Department
 Winnetka Police Department
 Winthrop Harbor Police Department
 Witt Police Department
 Wood Dale Police Department
 Wood River Police Department
 Woodhull Police Department
 Woodridge Police Department
 Woodstock Police Department
 Worden Police Department
 Worth Police Department
 Wyanet Police Department
 Wyoming Police Department 
 Xenia Police Department
 Yorkville Police Department
 Zeigler Police Department
 Zion Police Department

Special district agencies

Park district police agencies 
 Canton Park District Police Department
 Crystal Lake Park District Police Department
 Decatur Park District Police Department
 East St Louis Park District Police Department
 Fondulac Park District Police Department
 Fox Valley Park District Police Department
 Hawthorne Park District Police Department
 Lockport Township Park District Police Department
 Morton Grove Park District Police Department
 Naperville Park District Police Department
 Pekin Park District Police Department
 Peoria Park District Police Department
 Rockford Park District Police Department
 Round Lake Area Park District Police Department
 Springfield Park District Police Department
 Zion Park District Police Department

Other special district agencies 

 Abraham Lincoln Capital Airport Police Department
 Chicago Zoological Society Police Department
 Effingham Water Authority Police Department
 Metra Police Department
 Metropolitan Airport Authority of Rock Island County Public Safety
 Metropolitan Water Reclamation District of Greater Chicago Police Department (formerly Chicago Sanitary District Police Department)
 Northern Indiana Commuter Transportation District Police

College and university agencies 

 Aurora University Campus Public Safety Department
 Augustana College Police Department
 Benedictine University Police Department Lisle Campus
 Benedictine University Police Department Springfield Campus
 Bradley University Police Department
 Chicago State University Police Department
 Eastern Illinois University Police Department
 Eureka College Police Department
 Governors State University Police Department
 Illinois State University Police Department
 Lewis University Police Department
 Loyola University Chicago Department of Campus Safety
 McKendree University Public Safety
 Millikin University Campus Police Department
 Moody Bible Institute Department of Public Safety
 North Central College Department of Public Safety
 Northeastern Illinois University Police Department
 Northern Illinois University Police Department
 Northwestern University Police Department
 Rockford University Department of Police and Public Safety
 Saint Xavier University Department of Public Safety
 Southern Illinois University Carbondale Police Department
 Southern Illinois University Edwardsville Police Department
 Southern Illinois University School of Medicine Office of Police and Security
 University of Chicago Police Department
 University of Illinois at Chicago Police Department
 University of Illinois at Springfield Police Department
 University of Illinois at Urbana-Champaign Police Department
 Western Illinois University - Office of Public Safety

Community or junior college agencies 

 Black Hawk College Police Department
 City College of Chicago Campus Police Department
 College of DuPage Police Department
 College of Lake County Police Department
 Elgin Community College Police Department
 Harper College Police Department
 Illinois Central College Campus Police Department
 John A. Logan College Police Department
 John Wood Community College Police Department
 Joliet Junior College Police Department
 Kankakee Community College Police Department
 Kaskaskia College Police Department 
 Lake Land College Police Department
 Lincoln Land Community College Police Department
 McHenry County College Police Department
 Moraine Valley Community College Police Department
 Morton College Police Department
 Oakton Community College Police Department
 Parkland College Police Department
 Rend Lake College Police Department
 Rock Valley College Police Department
 South Suburban College Police Department
 Southwestern Illinois College Police Department
 Triton College Police Department
 Waubonsee Community College Police Department

Railroad police departments 

 Ag Valley Railroad Police Department
 Alton & Southern Railway Police Department
 Amtrak Police Department
 Belt Railway Police Department
 Burlington Northern and Santa Fe Railroad Police Department
 Canadian National Railway Police
 Canadian Pacific Railway Police Service
 CSX Transportation Police Department

 Norfolk Southern Railway Police Department
 Terminal Railroad Police Department
 Union Pacific Railroad Police Department

Disbanded/Defunct agencies 

 Chicago Department of Aviation Police Department
 Chicago Housing Authority Police Department
 Chicago Park District Police Department
 Chicago Transit Authority Police Department 
 Clyde Park District Police Department 
 Dixmoor Park District Police Department
Ford Heights Police Department
 Forest Park Park District Police Department 
 Illinois Department of Central Management Services Police 
 Illinois Department of Mental Health Police 
London Mills Police Department
 Maywood Park District Police Department
 Memorial Park District Police Department
 Peoria Public Schools Campus Police Department
 Markham Park District Police Department
 East Chicago Heights Police Department was renamed Ford Heights Police Department before being disbanded as stated above.
 The Park Forest South Police Department changed their name to University Park Police Department.
 Thornton Community College Police Department is currently named South Suburban Community College Police Department.
Westfield Police Department

See also

 Crime in Illinois
 Law enforcement in the United States

References

Illinois

Law enforcement agencies